Crystal Falls Township is a civil township of Iron County in the Upper Peninsula of the U.S. state of Michigan.  As of the 2000 census, the township population was 1,722. The city of Crystal Falls is located in the southern portion of the township, but is administratively autonomous.

Geography

Demographics
As of the census of 2000, there were 1,722 people, 737 households, and 487 families residing in the township.  The population density was 7.5 people per square mile (2.9/km2).  There were 1,207 housing units at an average density of 5.3 per square mile (2.0/km2).  The racial makeup of the township was 97.79% White - of which 19.9% were of Finnish, 14.1% German, 12.1% Italian, 10.6% Polish, 10.0% Swedish, and 6.5% English ancestry - 0.23% African American, 0.17% Native American, 0.23% Asian, 0.06% from other races, 0.35% Hispanic or Latino, and 1.51% from two or more races.

Out of the 737 households, 22.0% had children under the age of 18 living with them, 55.8% were married couples living together, 5.7% had a single female with no husband present, and 33.8% were non-families. 30.8% of all households were made up of multiple individuals, and 16.3% had someone living alone who was 65 years of age or older.  The average household size was 2.18 and the average family size was 2.69.

In the township, 18.6% of the population was under the age of 18, 4.2% was between the ages of 18 and 24, 20.7% between the ages of 25 and 44, 30.5% between the ages of 45 and 64, and 26.0% 65 years or older.  The median age was 48 years. For every 100 females, there were 95.7 males.  For every 100 females ages 18 and older, there were 93.9 males ages 18 and older.

The median income for a household in the township was $34,688, and the median income for a family was $41,600. Males had a median income of $31,600 versus $22,115 for females. The per capita income for the township was $18,213.  About 3.5% of families and 6.9% of the population were below the poverty line, including 5.4% of those under age 18 and 8.3% of those age 65 or over.

References

Townships in Iron County, Michigan
Townships in Michigan